Zay Gwet is a weekly newspaper published in Burma. It specializes in economics and market study and related subjects.

See also
List of newspapers in Burma

References

Weekly newspapers published in Myanmar